Kevin Miles was the Chief Executive Officer of Zoës Kitchen but retired in 2018. Miles was born and raised in South Texas and graduated from Texas A&M University.

Miles joined Zoës Kitchen in 2009 as EVP of Operations. Miles was recruited from his role as EVP of Operations of Pollo Campero by Greg Dollarhyde, Zoës’ chairman and then CEO and its private equity sponsor, Brentwood Associates. In 2011, Miles was appointed Chief Operating Officer, and subsequently named CEO in 2012.

In 2016, Miles was a winner for Ernst & Young's Entrepreneur of the Year Retail Award for the Southwest Region.

References 

Year of birth missing (living people)
Living people
Texas A&M University alumni
American chief executives of food industry companies